Astore may refer to:

Astore District, a district in Gilgit Baltistan, northern Pakistan
Astore (city), the capital of the Astore District
Astore River, a tributary of the Indus River, running through Astore Valley
Astore Valley, in Astore District
Italian ship Astore, several ships with the name

See also 
 Astor (disambiguation)